The Thane Metro is a planned Mass Rapid Transit system for the city of Thane, Maharashtra, India. It will feature 22 stations along a  route (26 km elevated and 3 km underground) and will be connected to lines 4 and 5 of the Mumbai Metro. It'll be also integrated and connected to the proposed New Thane Railway Station and existing  Thane Railway Station. The project will be implemented by the Thane Municipal Corporation (TMC) and the Maharashtra Metro Rail Corporation (Maha Metro). 

The Maharashtra Government Cabinet Headed by Chief Minister Devendra Fadnavis approved Thane internal ring metro project on  6 March 2019. The Construction was expected to be completed in 4–5 years at a cost of. ₹13,095 crore. The proposed cost of the tickets will vary from ₹17 to ₹104. The roofs of the metro stations are planned to be fitted with solar panels, which will provide up to 65% of the electricity requirements for the system.

Stations 
There will be a total of 22 stations. 20 Elevated Stations and two Underground.

Timeline 
December 2018 - DPR approved by Thane Municipal Corporation.

January 2019 - DPR submitted by Thane Municipal Corporation to Maharashtra Government.

March 2019 - DPR approved by Maharashtra cabinet.

December 2020 - Revised Metrolite DPR approved by Thane Municipal Corporation.

September 2021 - Metrolite plan scrapped and Revised regular Metro DPR approved by Thane Municipal Corporation.

See also
Urban rail transit in India
Mumbai Metro
Navi Mumbai Metro
Pune Metro
Nagpur Metro
Greater Nashik Metro

References 

Transport in Thane
Proposed infrastructure in Maharashtra
Transport in Maharashtra
Proposed rapid transit in India